Bunker Hill Bunny is a 1950 Warner Bros. Merrie Melodies theatrical cartoon short directed by Friz Freleng and written by Tedd Pierce. The short was released on September 23, 1950 and stars Bugs Bunny and Yosemite Sam as a Hessian mercenary in the American Revolution.

Plot 
The story opens with a title card indicating a time setting of 1776, before switching to footages of the Battle of Bunker Hill and the Siege of Yorktown. The scene then transitions to the Battle of Bagle Heights, where Bugs, dressed as an American Minuteman, is defending a wooden fort against the red-coated Sam von Schamm (or Schmamm), the Hessian, attacking from a large stone fortress. Sam's fortress is heavily armored, bristling with artillery; by contrast, Bugs' defenses are rather pathetic, with only one cannon.

Even then, Sam is the only one manning his fort, which makes capturing Bugs' difficult, considering the rabbit is able to retaliate by capturing his simultaneously.  Sam attempts to continue his bombardment, but Bugs is able to put up a defence by simply catching his opponent's cannonballs with his own cannon and firing them back. When Bugs tires of that contest, he fires a large cork to plug Sam's main mortar. Sam is shot in the face while trying to remove the cork.

Frustrated, Sam burrows his way under his base and into Bugs' base using a pickaxe. Upon surfacing, Sam lights a match, only to find himself in a room full of TNT. An explosion occurs in a shack where the room is, with Sam stumbling out, dazed.

As the last gambit, Sam uses a keg of gunpowder in an attempt to blow up Bug's base; unbeknownst to Sam, gunpowder falls into Sam's back pocket due to a hole in the keg, creating a trail of gunpowder. After Sam lights the fuse, Bugs, sitting on the powder keg and munching a carrot, calmly extinguishes it and nonchalantly lights the trail of gunpowder left by Sam. Fleeing from the inevitable trail, Sam runs away from the base and up an apple tree, which eventually explodes on him.

At this setback, a thoroughly defeated Sam admits that he is a "Hessian without no aggression," and decides to defect to the rebels by saying, "If you can't beat 'em, join 'em." To this, Bugs and Sam march side by side in a fife-and-drum march reminiscent of the Archibald Willard painting The Spirit of '76, playing the song The Girl I Left Behind Me.

Cast
Mel Blanc as Bugs Bunny and Yosemite Sam

In popular culture

The Yosemite Sam Shortwave Radio Transmission

On December 19, 2004, a possible Numbers station began transmitting from the desert near Albuquerque, New Mexico, using one of the quotes from the episode which is Yosemite Sam threatening Bugs Bunny: "Varmit, I'm gonna blow ya to smithereenies !". Prior to the quote, the station would use the sound of a buzzer (an 8-second data burst similar to the Russian numbers station UVB-76) later followed by the quote. This was later called the "Yosemite Sam Transmission". On December 23, 2004, the station ceased transmission for two months, before returning in February 2005 with additional frequencies on FM Radio (WWV and WWVH); but, after the broadcast location was tracked, the station ceased transmission for the second time, and this time for good. The station transmitted on the frequencies: 3,700 kHz, 4,300 kHz, 6,500 kHz and 10,500 kHz.
The station was later revealed to be run by Mobility Assessment Test and Integration Center, sometimes shortened as MATIC. The location also suggested that it was a reference to a Bugs Bunny quote: "I knew I should have taken that left turn, at Albuquerque !".

See also 
List of Bugs Bunny cartoons
List of Yosemite Sam cartoons
List of Shortwave Radio Transmissions

References

External links 

 Bunker Hill Bunny at The Big Cartoon DataBase

1950 films
1950 animated films
1950 short films
Merrie Melodies short films
Short films directed by Friz Freleng
American Revolutionary War films
Films set in 1776
1950s English-language films
Films scored by Carl Stalling
Bugs Bunny films
1950s Warner Bros. animated short films
Yosemite Sam films